Lindley Armstrong "Spike" Jones (December 14, 1911 – May 1, 1965) was an American musician and bandleader specializing in spoof arrangements of popular songs and classical music. Ballads receiving the Jones treatment were punctuated with gunshots, whistles, cowbells, hiccups, burps, and outlandish and comedic vocals. Jones and his band recorded under the title Spike Jones and His City Slickers from the early 1940s to the mid-1950s, and toured the United States and Canada as "The Musical Depreciation Revue".

Biography

Lindley Armstrong Jones was born in Long Beach, California, the son of Ada (Armstrong) and Lindley Murray Jones, a Southern Pacific railroad agent. Young Lindley Jones was given the nickname 'Spike' for being so thin that he was compared to a railroad spike. At the age of 11 he got his first set of drums. As a teenager he played in bands that he formed himself; Jones' first band was called Spike Jones and his Five Tacks. A railroad restaurant chef taught him how to use pots and pans, forks, knives and spoons as musical instruments. Jones frequently played in theater pit orchestras. In the 1930s, he joined the Victor Young orchestra and got many offers to appear on radio shows, including Al Jolson's Lifebuoy Program, Burns and Allen, and Bing Crosby's Kraft Music Hall.

Jones became bored playing the same music each night with the orchestras. He found other like-minded musicians and they began playing parodies of standard songs for their own entertainment. The musicians wanted their wives to share their enjoyment, so they recorded their weekly performances. One of the recordings made its way into the hands of an RCA Victor executive, who offered the musicians a recording contract. One of the City Slickers' early recordings for the label was a Del Porter arrangement of  "Der Fuehrer's Face". The record's success inspired Jones to become the band's leader. He initially thought the popularity the record brought them would fade. However, audiences kept asking for more, so Jones started working on more comic arrangements.

From 1937 to 1942, Jones was the percussionist for the John Scott Trotter Orchestra, which played on Bing Crosby's first recording of "White Christmas". He was part of a backing band for songwriter Cindy Walker during her early recording career with Decca Records and Standard Transcriptions. Her song "We're Gonna Stomp Them City Slickers Down" provided the inspiration for the name of Jones's future band.

The City Slickers developed from the Feather Merchants, a band led by vocalist-clarinetist Del Porter, who took a back seat to Jones during the group's embryonic years. They made experimental records for the Cinematone Corporation and performed publicly in Los Angeles, gaining a small following. Original members included vocalist-violinist Carl Grayson, banjoist Perry Botkin, trombonist King Jackson and pianist Stan Wrightsman.

The band's early records were issued on RCA Victor's budget-priced Bluebird label, but were soon moved to the more-prestigious Victor label. They recorded extensively for the company until 1955. They also starred in various radio programs (1945–1949) and in their own NBC and CBS television shows from 1954 to 1961.

During the 1940s, prominent band members included:

George Rock (trumpet, and vocals from 1944 to 1960)
Mickey Katz (clarinet, vocals)
Doodles Weaver (vocals – specialized in playing sports commentators and absentminded singers who persistently scrambled their lyrics into malapropisms and digressed into stand-up comedy)
Red Ingle (sax, vocals)
Frank Rehak (trombone)
Del Porter (clarinet, vocals)
Carl Grayson (violin, vocals)
Perry Botkin (banjo)
Country Washburne (tuba)
Luther "Red" Roundtree (banjo)
Earl Bennett, a.k.a. Sir Frederick Gas (vocals)
Joe Siracusa (drums; died 2021)
Joe Colvin (trombone)
Roger Donley (tuba)
Dick Gardner (sax, violin)
Paul Leu (piano)
Jack Golly (trumpet, clarinet)
John Stanley (trombone)
Don Anderson (trumpet)
Charlotte Tinsley (harp)
Eddie Metcalfe (saxophone)
Dick Morgan (banjo)
George Lescher (piano)
Freddy Morgan (banjo, vocals)
A. Purvis Pullen, a.k.a. Dr. Horatio Q. Birdbath (bird calls, dog barks)
 Russ "Candy" Hall (bass, tuba)

The band's 1950s personnel included:
Helen Grayco (vocals)
Earl Bennett, as Sir Frederick Gas 
Billy Barty (vocals and comedy routines, including impersonations of Liberace)
Lock Martin (comedy routines)
Freddy Morgan (banjo)
Peter James (vocals)
Jad Paul (banjo)
Gil Bernal (sax, vocals)
Paul Garner (vocals)
Bernie Jones (sax, vocals)
Phil Gray (trombone)
Marilyn Olsen Oliveri (vocals, harp)

The liner notes for at least two RCA compilation albums claimed that the two Morgans were brothers (the 1949 radio shows actually billed them as "Dick and Freddy Morgan"), but this was not true; Freddy's real name was Morgenstern. Peter James (who was sometimes billed as Bobby Pinkus) and Paul "Mousie" Garner were former members of Ted Healy's stage act on Broadway. James joined Healy for a two-year run in the Shubert revue A Night in Spain (1927–1928) where he worked alongside Shemp Howard and Larry Fine. Mousie joined with Healy from 1931 to 1932 after Moe Howard, Larry Fine and Shemp Howard had their first split with Ted, and with fellow Healy "stooges" Dick Hakins and Jack Wolfe, appeared in the Broadway shows The Gang's All Here and Billy Rose's Crazy Quilt. Mousie, with Hakins and Sammy Glasser (aka Sammy Wolfe) rejoined Healy in 1937 for radio and personal appearances, until Healy's death in December 1937.

Spike Jones's second wife, singer Helen Grayco, performed in his stage and television shows. Jones had four children: Linda (by his first wife, Patricia), Spike Jr.,  Leslie Ann, and Gina. Spike Jr. is a producer of live events and television broadcasts. Leslie Ann is the Director of Music and Film Scoring at George Lucas' Skywalker Ranch in Marin County.

Record hits

"Der Fuehrer's Face"
A strike by the American Federation of Musicians in 1942 prevented Jones from making commercial recordings for over two years. He could, however, make records for radio broadcasts. These were released on the Standard Transcriptions label (1941–1946) and have been reissued on a CD compilation called (Not) Your Standard Spike Jones Collection.

Recorded just days before the recording ban, Jones scored a huge broadcast hit late in 1942 with "Der Fuehrer's Face", a song ridiculing Adolf Hitler, which followed every use of the word "Heil" with a derisive raspberry sound, as in the repeated phrase " Heil, (raspberry), Heil (raspberry), right in Der Fuehrer's face!".

More spoof songs

The romantic ballad "Cocktails for Two", originally written to evoke an intimate romantic rendezvous, was re-recorded by Spike Jones in 1944 as a raucous, horn-honking, voice-gurgling, hiccuping hymn to the cocktail hour. The Jones version was a huge hit.

Other Jones spoofs followed: "Hawaiian War Chant", "Chloe", "Holiday for Strings", "You Always Hurt the One You Love", "My Old Flame", referring to Peter Lorre's voice (impersonated on the recording by Paul Frees) and eerie scenes in contemporary movies, and many more.

"Ghost Riders"
Spike's parody of Vaughn Monroe's rendition of "Ghost Riders in the Sky" was performed as if sung by a drunkard and ridiculed Monroe by name in its final stanza: CHORUS: 'Cause all we hear is "Ghost Riders" sung by Vaughn Monroe.
I.W. HARPER: I can do without his singing.
SIR FREDERICK GAS: But I wish I had his dough!
The official American release edited out the dig at Monroe, because Monroe, a popular RCA Victor recording artist and also a major RCA stockholder, demanded it. The original version was released in the European market in 1949. (A limited number of original 78 rpm pressings containing the first ending were mistakenly released on the West Coast and are a prized rarity today.) The original recording with the unedited ending was later issued on a German RCA LP collection and on some CD and audio tape releases containing the song.

"Trailer Annie"
In the 1940s, Spike also recorded a comedic song titled "Trailer Annie", about a woman who tries to find a job in the United States military.

"All I Want for Christmas"
Jones's recording, "All I Want for Christmas Is My Two Front Teeth", with a piping vocal by George Rock, was a number-one hit in 1948. (Dora Bryan recorded a 1963 variation, "All I Want For Christmas is a Beatle".)

Murdering the Classics

Among the recordings Spike Jones and his City Slickers made in the 1940s were many humorous takes on classical music such as the adaptation of Liszt's Liebestraum No. 3, played at a breakneck pace on unusual instruments. Others followed: Rossini's William Tell Overture was rendered on kitchen implements using a horse race as a backdrop, with one of the "horses" in the "race" likely to have inspired the nickname of the lone chrome yellow-painted SNJ aircraft flown by the U.S. Navy's Blue Angels aerobatic team's shows in the late 1940s, "Beetle Bomb". In live shows Spike would acknowledge the applause with complete solemnity, saying "Thank you, music lovers." An LP collection of twelve of these "homicides" was released by RCA (on its prestigious Red Seal label) in 1971 as Spike Jones Is Murdering the Classics. They include such tours de force as Pal-Yat-Chee (Pagliacci), sung by the Hillbilly humorists Homer and Jethro, Ponchielli's Dance of the Hours, Tchaikovsky's None but the Lonely Heart, Strauss's Blue Danube waltz and Bizet's Carmen.

In 1944, RCA Victor released "Spike Jones presents for the Kiddies" version of Tchaikovsky's Nutcracker Suite, in three 10 inch 78 rpm records, P-143, arrangement credited to Joe "Country" Washburne with lyrics by Foster Carling. The set was also issued by RCA Victor on three 7 inch vinyl 45 rpm records in 1949 as WP-143 and on one 45rpm "extended play" record, EPA-143 in 1952. An abridged and re-sequenced version of the recording is also included in the aforementioned RCA Red Seal 'classics' album, with the complete original version available on the CD collection Spiked: The Music of Spike Jones.

Radio
After appearing as the house band on The Bob Burns Show, Spike got his own radio show on NBC, The Chase and Sanborn Program, as Edgar Bergen's summer replacement in 1945. Frances Langford was co-host and Groucho Marx was among the guests. The guest list for Jones's 1947–49 CBS program for Coca-Cola (originally The Spotlight Revue, retitled The Spike Jones Show for its final season) included Frankie Laine, Mel Torme, Peter Lorre, Don Ameche and Burl Ives. Frank Sinatra appeared on the show twice October 1, 1948 & December 3, 1948 and Lassie in May 1949. Jones's resident "girlsinger" during this period was Dorothy Shay, "The Park Avenue Hillbillie." One of the announcers on Jones's CBS show was the young Mike Wallace. Writers included Eddie Maxwell, Eddie Brandt and Jay Sommers. The final program in the series was broadcast in June 25, 1949.

Spike Jones and His Other Orchestra
While Jones enjoyed the fame and prosperity, he was annoyed that nobody seemed to see beyond the craziness. Determined to show the world that he was capable of producing legitimate "pretty" music, he formed a second group in 1946. Spike Jones and His Other Orchestra played lush arrangements of dance hits. This alternate group played nightclub engagements and was an artistic success, but the paying public preferred the City Slickers and stayed away. Jones wound up paying some of the band's expenses out of his own pocket. Some of the City Slickers band members appeared and recorded with the Other Orchestra, but most of the Other Orchestra personnel consisted of "serious," accomplished studio musicians from the Los Angeles area.

The one outstanding recording by the Other Orchestra is "Laura", which features a serious first half (played exquisitely by the Other Orchestra) and a manic second half (played hilariously by the City Slickers).

Jones's son, Spike Jones Jr., called attention to the precision of his father's most outlandish musical arrangements: "One of the things that people don't realize about Dad's kind of music is, when you replace a C-sharp with a gunshot, it has to be a C-sharp gunshot or it sounds awful."

Movies
In 1940, Jones had an uncredited bandleading part in the Dead End Kids film Give Us Wings, appearing on camera for about four seconds.

As the band's fame grew, Hollywood producers hired the Slickers as a specialty act for feature films, including Thank Your Lucky Stars (1943), Meet the People (1944), Bring on the Girls (1945), Breakfast in Hollywood (1946) and Variety Girl (1947). Jones was set to team with Abbott and Costello for a 1954 Universal Pictures comedy, but when Lou Costello withdrew for medical reasons, Universal replaced the comedy team with look-alikes Hugh O'Brian and Buddy Hackett, and promoted Jones to the leading role. The finished film, Fireman Save My Child, turned out to be Spike Jones's only top-billed theatrical movie.

Soundies
In 1942, the Jones gang worked on numerous Soundies, musical shorts similar to later music videos which were shown on coin-operated projectors in small nightclubs, arcades, malt shops, and taverns. The band appeared on camera under their own name in four of the Soundies ("Clink! Clink! Another Drink", "Pass the Biscuits, Mirandy", "The Sheik of Araby", and "Blacksmith Song"), and, according to musicologist Mark Cantor, provided background music for at least thirteen others. Mel Blanc, the voice of Bugs Bunny and other Warner Brothers cartoon characters, performed a drunken, hiccuping verse for 1942's "Clink! Clink! Another Drink" (reissued in 1949 as "The Clink! Clink! Polka").

Television

Jones saw the potential of television and filmed two half-hour pilot films, Foreign Legion and Wild Bill Hiccup, in the summer of 1950. Veteran comedy director Eddie Cline worked on both, but neither was successful. The band fared much better on live television, where their spontaneous antics and crazy visual gags guaranteed the viewers a good time. Spike usually dressed in a suit with an enormous check pattern and was seen leaping around playing a washboard, cowbells, a suite of klaxons and foghorns, then xylophone, then shooting a pistol. The band starred in variety shows, such as The Colgate Comedy Hour (1951, 1955) and their All Star Revue (1952) before being given his own slot by NBC, The Spike Jones Show, which aired early in 1954, and Club Oasis on NBC, in the summer of 1958; and by CBS, as The Spike Jones Show, in the summers of 1957, 1960, and 1961. Jones and his City Slickers also appeared on NBC's The Ford Show, Starring Tennessee Ernie Ford in the episode which aired on November 15, 1956.  In 1990, BBC2 screened six compilation shows from these broadcasts; they were subsequently aired on PBS stations.

Later years
The rapid decline of big bands immediately following the end of World War II and the rise of rock and roll in the early 1950s had a marked effect on Spike Jones's repertoire. Early rock songs were already novelties, and Jones could not spoof them the same way he had lampooned "Cocktails for Two", "Laura" or "Chloe". He played rock music for laughs when he presented "for the first time on television, the bottom half of Elvis Presley!" This was the cue for a pair of pants—inhabited by dwarf actor Billy Barty—to scamper across the stage.

Jones was always prepared to adapt to changing tastes. In 1950, when America was nostalgically looking back at the 1920s, Jones recorded a straight album of Charleston arrangements. In 1953, he responded to the growing market for children's records, with tunes aimed directly at kids (like "Socko, the Smallest Snowball"). Over the years, Jones had become increasingly unhappy at RCA Victor due to management censoring his recordings and other matters, and he left the label in 1955. His later recordings were issued by Verve, Liberty and Warner Bros. In 1956, Jones supervised an album of Christmas songs, many of which were performed seriously. In 1957, noting the television success of Lawrence Welk and his dance band, he revamped his own act for television. Gone was the old City Slickers mayhem, replaced by a more straightforward big-band sound, with tongue-in-cheek comic moments. The new band was known as Spike Jones and the Band that Plays for Fun. The last record credited to the City Slickers was the LP Dinner Music for People Who Aren't Very Hungry. Spoken-word comedy (Bob Newhart, Mort Sahl, Stan Freberg, Shelley Berman) was the current trend in comedy records. Spike Jones adapted to this, too; most of his later albums are spoken-word comedy, including the horror-genre sendup Spike Jones in Stereo (1959) and the send-up of television programs of the period in Omnibust (1960). Jones remained topical to the last: his final group, Spike Jones's New Band, recorded four LPs of brassy renditions of pop-folk tunes of the 1960s (including "Washington Square" and "The Ballad of Jed Clampett"). One of his New Band tracks in 1964 was a cover of "Dominique", a recent hit by The Singing Nun, in which he not only plays part of the melody on a banjo but melds the melody successfully with "When the Saints Go Marching In"

Jones was a lifelong heavy smoker, reportedly 4-5 packs a day, and eventually he developed breathing problems, including emphysema. Never the picture of health, his emphysema advanced to the point where he used an oxygen tank both on and offstage and he was confined to a seat behind his drum set while performing. In spite of his illness, he continued smoking until his death on May 1, 1965, at the age of 53. He is interred in Holy Cross Cemetery, Culver City, California.

His second wife, Helen Grayco, died as a result of cancer in Los Angeles on August 20, 2022, at the age of 97.

Influence and legacy
There is a clear line of influence from Harry Reser's 1920s hot-comic "Six Jumping Jacks" band (whose drummer and vocalist was the distinctive Tom Stacks, "The Voice With a Smile"), the Hoosier Hot Shots, Freddie Fisher and his Schnickelfritzers, and the Marx Brothers to Spike Jones — and to Stan Freberg, Gerard Hoffnung, Peter Schickele's P.D.Q. Bach, The Goons, Joe Raposo, Mr. Bungle, Frank Zappa, George Maciunas, The Bonzo Dog Doo-Dah Band, The Mystic Knights of the Oingo Boingo, and "Weird Al" Yankovic. According to David Wild's review in Rolling Stone Magazine, Elvis Costello's 1989 Album "Spike" was named partly in tribute to Jones.

Syndicated radio personality Dr. Demento regularly features Jones' records on his program of comedy and novelty tracks. Jones is mentioned in The Band's song, "Up on Cripple Creek". (The song's protagonist's paramour states of Jones: "I can't take the way he sings, but I love to hear him talk.") Novelist Thomas Pynchon is an admirer and wrote the liner notes for a 1994 CD reissue, Spiked! (BMG Catalyst). A scene in the romantic comedy I.Q. shows a man demonstrating the sound of his new stereo to Meg Ryan's character by playing a Jones recording.

In the 1948 Warner Bros. Merrie Melodies animated short Back Alley Oproar, a caterwauling Sylvester the Cat does a Spike Jones-inspired solo finale cover of "Angel in Disguise" by opening with a brief, serious-sounding introduction before immediately breaking into a jazzy rendition featuring a collection of crazy sound effects produced by firing guns, breaking bottles and exploding firecrackers among other sounds, much to Elmer Fudd's annoyance.

Spike Jones is referenced several times in the American TV series M*A*S*H. In season 2, episode 5 "Dr. Pierce and Mr. Hyde", an exhausted Hawkeye sings a line of "Der Fuehrer's Face" in reference to the great songs that came out of World War II; in the season 8 episode ""Good-Bye, Radar: Part 1," when Radar returns from leave in Tokyo to a generator-less 4077th, he calls up Sparky to unsuccessfully bargain for a new one with a variety of items which included some Spike Jones records and in the season 11 episode  "Foreign Affairs," visiting French Red Cross nurse Martine LeClerc (Melinda Mullins), who develops a warm if brief affair with Charles Emerson Winchester III tells him that she's a huge fan of Spike Jones, which inspires him to admit, in a rare confession, secretly loving Tom & Jerry cartoons.

In 1974, Tony Levin (future bass player for King Crimson), recording under the name, The Clams, released a Spike Jones tribute of him giving the songs "Close To You" by The Carpenters and "The First Time Ever I Saw Your Face" by Roberta Flack, the Jones treatment.

In 1986, the Belgian synthpop group Telex paid homage to Spike Jones in their album Looney Tunes, with a song named after him. The intro of that song is a part of the intro from "Camptown Races".

In 1997, singers Artie Schroeck and Linda November directed a production in Atlantic City titled "The New City Slickers Present a Tribute to Spike Jones", with a band that attempted to re-create the style and humor of Jones's music.

Both Spike Milligan and Spike Jonze were nick-named in reference to Jones.

Discography
 Spike Jones Plays the Charleston (1950)
 Bottoms Up, Polka (1952)
 Spike Jones Murders Carmen and Kids the Classics (1953)
 Dinner Music For People Who Aren't Very Hungry (1956)
 Spike Jones Presents a Xmas Spectacular (1956) (reissued as It's a Spike Jones Christmas and Let's Sing a Song of Christmas)
 Hi Fi Polka Party (1957)
 Spike Jones in Stereo (1959) (reissued as Spike Jones in Hi Fi)
 Omnibust (1960)
 60 Years of "Music America Hates Best" (1960)
 Thank You Music Lovers! (1960) (reissued as The Best of Spike Jones in 1967 and 1975)
 Rides, Rapes and Rescues (1960)
 Washington Square (1963)
 Spike Jones New Band (1964)
 My Man (1964)
 The New Band of Spike Jones Plays Hank Williams Hits (1965)
 Spike Jones Is Murdering the Classics (1971)
 The Best of Spike Jones Volume 2 (1977)
 Spike Jones and His Other Orchestra, 1946 (Hindsight Records HUK185 1982)
 Never Trust a city Slicker: Standard Transcription Discs 1942–1944 (Harlequin HQ2042 1986)

Select singles

References

Other sources

Further reading
 No ISBN.

External links

Red Hot Jazz
Phillywire article with added links
Swedish homepage about Spike Jones 78-rpm records

1911 births
1965 deaths
American bandleaders
American comedy musicians
American novelty song performers
American parodists
Big band bandleaders
Parody musicians
RCA Victor artists
Liberty Records artists
Burials at Holy Cross Cemetery, Culver City
Deaths from emphysema
Musicians from Long Beach, California
20th-century American musicians
20th-century American comedians
American music arrangers
Comedians from Los Angeles County
Long Beach Polytechnic High School alumni